Forest parks in Thailand are protected areas set aside for conservation and protection from development owing to their natural scenic value that are too small to be declared national parks. The forest parks are managed by the fourteen protected areas regional offices and two branches. Thailand's forest parks fall under IUCN Category V, Protected Landscape.

Since the first protected area was established in Thailand, their capacity to achieve their purpose has been under multiple challenges. As other protected areas such as national parks and wildlife sanctuaries, forest parks are not free from severe threats such as land encroachment, illegal logging and poaching.

Thai highlands

Not yet published in the Government Gazette

Northeast

Not yet published in the Government Gazette

Central-East

Not yet published in the Government Gazette

South

Notes

PARO: Protected Areas Regional Office is the management area of the following offices:

Keyword for forest park names:

References

Thailand geography-related lists